Euryades is a genus of butterflies in the family Papilionidae. They are native to South America.

Species
 Euryades corethrus (Boisduval, 1836)
 Euryades duponchelii (Lucas, 1839)

References
 
Edwin Möhn, 2002 Schmetterlinge der Erde, Butterflies of the World Part XIIII (14), Papilionidae VIII: Baronia, Euryades, Protographium, Neographium, Eurytides. Edited by Erich Bauer and Thomas Frankenbach Keltern: Goecke & Evers; Canterbury: Hillside Books.  All species and subspecies are included, also most of the forms. Several females are shown the first time in colour.

External links

 

 

Papilionidae of South America
Butterfly genera
Taxa named by Baron Cajetan von Felder
Taxa named by Rudolf Felder